Trinity Island may refer to:

 Trinity Island, Palmer Archipelago, Antarctica
 Trinity Island, Willis Islands, South Georgia
 Trinity Islands (Nunavut), an uninhabited island group offshore Baffin Island, belonging to the Canadian territory of Nunavut
 Trinity Islands (Alaska), an uninhabited island group consisting of the two larger islands Sitkinak and Tugidak, as well as several smaller islands, lying off Kodiak Island and belonging to Kodiak Island Borough in the U.S. state of Alaska
 Trinity Islands, Manchester, a proposed skyscraper development in Manchester, England.

See also 
 Trindade and Martim Vaz (Trinity and Martim Vaz), archipelago in Brazil